"Out Goin' Cattin'" is a song written by Mark Miller and Randy Scruggs, and released by American country music group Sawyer Brown.  It featured guest vocals from Joe Bonsall of the Oak Ridge Boys. He was credited as Cat Joe Bonsall. It was released in September 1986 as the lead-off single and title tracks to Sawyer Brown's third album Out Goin' Cattin'.  It peaked at number 11 on the Billboard Hot Country Songs chart and number 4 the Canadian RPM country singles chart.

Music video
The music video was directed by Martin Kahan and premiered in September 1986.

Chart performance

References

1986 singles
1986 songs
Sawyer Brown songs
Songs written by Mark Miller (musician)
Songs written by Randy Scruggs
Capitol Records Nashville singles
Curb Records singles
Vocal collaborations